Cobbs Creek is a  long 2nd order tributary to Hyco Creek in Person County, North Carolina.  Cobbs Creek joins Hyco Creek within Hyco Lake.

Course
Cobbs Creek rises in a pond about 0.5 miles southeast of Leasburg, North Carolina and then flows north and northeast to join Hyco Creek about 3 miles southeast of Semora, North Carolina.  Cobbs Creek briefly flows into Caswell County before turning back into Person County.

Watershed
Cobbs Creek drains  of area, receives about 46.2 in/year of precipitation, has a wetness index of 406.62, and is about 70% forested.

References

Rivers of North Carolina
Rivers of Caswell County, North Carolina
Rivers of Person County, North Carolina
Tributaries of the Roanoke River